Anne Vibeke Roggen (born 1 February 1952) is a Norwegian philologist, known for her translations from Latin and among the country's foremost experts on the humanist Niels Thomessøn.

Career 
Roggen is Associate Professor at the University of Oslo, specialising in philology, Latin translation and the work of the priest Niels Thomessøn. She demonstrated that his work "Cestus Sapphicus" is a rebus book, and not a textbook in Latin, as claimed by Francis Bull. She has also worked on the reception of Latin in Norway, with a particular focus on texts composed prior to 1650.  In 2005, she was admitted to the Academia Latinitati Fovendae. She writes and speaks widely about the value of classical history and its relevance to life today. 

In 2015 she worked on a new uncensored Norwegian-Latin dictionary, which included words for sexual acts which had been previously censored on a religious basis.

In 2018 she was outspoken against the dropping of the song Gaudeamus igitur from University of Oslo traditions.

References 

1952 births
Living people
Classical philologists
Academic staff of the University of Oslo
Women classical scholars
Norwegian women academics